Birkenhead Park School is a co-educational 11–16 secondary school with academy status near Birkenhead Park, in Birkenhead on the Wirral Peninsula in England. It was renamed University Academy Birkenhead in 2011 from the merger of Park High School and Rock Ferry High School and was based at the former Park High School site. It was a Grammar School (Park High Grammar School for Girls ) from 1926 to 1971, then went Co Educational in 1971 and was then just called Park High School.

University Academy Birkenhead was sponsored by the University of Chester, the University of Liverpool, Birkenhead Sixth Form College, Wirral Metropolitan College and Wirral Metropolitan Borough Council.
In April 2015 the school transferred to the control of the BePART Educational Trust, with Birkenhead Sixth Form College as sole sponsor, and took its current name.

Former pupils

Park High Grammar School
 Hilda Ellis Davidson, academic and antiquarian
Sir Leslie Froggatt, chairman of Shell Australia
Stephen F. Kelly, author and broadcaster
Peter Johnson, businessman
Tom Palin, artist
George Withy, journalist
Steve Wilcockson, archdeacon of Doncaster

Park High School 
 Emma Wray, television actress

Birkenhead Park School 

 George Hamilton, Entrepreneur

References

Schools in Birkenhead
Secondary schools in the Metropolitan Borough of Wirral
Academies in the Metropolitan Borough of Wirral
People educated at Birkenhead Park School